Agonum emarginatum is a species of ground beetle from Platyninae subfamily, that can be found in all European countries except for Andorra, Iceland, Liechtenstein, Malta, Monaco, Portugal, and Vatican City.

References

External links
Agonum emarginatum on Micro Pics

Beetles described in 1827
Beetles of Europe
emarginatum